is a Japanese educationist. He was a professor of Waseda University, and the provost of Tokyo Higher Normal School (today's University of Tsukuba). With educationists including Takashima (高島平三郎), he jointly founded the Children Research magazine in 1898, and in 1902 founded Children Research Society in Japan. In 1906, he was invited by Liangjiang Higher Normal School (today's Nanjing University) president Li Ruiqing and then came to China to be the school provost.

References

Presidents of universities and colleges in Japan
Academic staff of Waseda University
Academic staff of Nanjing University
1870 births
1932 deaths